Niyanun Lake is a glacial lake on the Mistik Creek chain in the Hudson Bay drainage basin in the Northern Region of Manitoba, Canada.

It sits in the Churchill River Upland portion of the Midwestern Canadian Shield forests which consist of mixed deciduous and coniferous trees. The lake is also situated on the well known "Mistik Creek Loop", a remote canoe route  in length which can be paddled in four days.

Niyanun means 'five' in Cree, as all of the fourteen lakes on Mistik Creek are named in numeric order in Cree.

The lake contains northern pike. The region around the lake consists of rocky parallel ridges with poorly drained areas of muskeg and irregular stony shorelines due to intense glaciation.

See also
List of lakes of Manitoba

References

Lakes of Northern Manitoba
Glacial lakes of Manitoba